Astrid Krebsbach (married name Horn), (9 February 1913 in Vienna - 17 September 1995 in Quedlinburg) was a German international table tennis player.

Table tennis career
From 1933 to 1937 she won eight medals in singles, doubles and team events in the World Table Tennis Championships.

The eight World Championship medals included one gold medal in the team event at the  1934 World Table Tennis Championships for Germany.

She also won an English Open title.

See also
 List of table tennis players
 List of World Table Tennis Championships medalists

References

German female table tennis players
1913 births
1995 deaths
20th-century German women